Jennifer Ayoo is a Ugandan politician and legislator in the eleventh parliament of Uganda serving as the member of parliament for Kalaki District in the Teso Sub-Region of Eastern Uganda. She is a member of the National Resistance Movement.(NRM)

Political career 
Ayoo won the National Resistance Movement primaries after defeating Maria Gorretti Ajilo a former member of Parliament for Kaberamaido District. She was then elected as the member of parliament in the 2021 elections

Other works 
Ayoo also helped in the fight against the further spread of coronavirus in Uganda by donating boxes of Covidex herbal medicine and personal Protective Equipment(PPEs) including  Sanitizers and boxes of face masks. Ayoo's donation was received by Kalaki District COVID-19 Task Force Committee which was headed by the Resident District Commissioner (RDC), Paul Kalikwani

See also 

 List of members of the eleventh Parliament of Uganda
 Robinah Nabbanja
 Parliament of Uganda
 National Unity Platform

References 

Living people
National Resistance Movement politicians
21st-century Ugandan politicians
21st-century Ugandan women politicians
Women members of the Parliament of Uganda
Members of the Parliament of Uganda
Year of birth missing (living people)